Maicol Azzolini (Pesaro, 15 October 1995) is an Italian rugby union player.
His usual position is as a Fly-Half and he currently plays for Fiamme Oro in Top12.

In 2015–16 Pro12 and 2016–17 Pro12, he named like Additional Player for Zebre in Pro 14. and in 2017–18 Pro14 and 2018–19 Pro14 seasons, he played for Zebre in Pro 14.

From 2013 to 2015 Azzolini was named in the Italy Under 20 squad and from 2016 to 2018, he also was named in the Emerging Italy squad.

References

External links 
It's Rugby France Profile
Ultimate Rugby Profile

People from Pesaro
Italian rugby union players
1995 births
Living people
Rugby union fly-halves
Sportspeople from the Province of Pesaro and Urbino
Fiamme Oro Rugby players
Zebre Parma players